Poliovirus receptor-related 2 (PVRL2), also known as nectin-2 and CD112 (formerly herpesvirus entry mediator B, HVEB), is a human plasma membrane glycoprotein.

Function
This gene encodes a single-pass type I membrane glycoprotein with two Ig-like C2-type domains and an Ig-like V-type domain. This protein is one of the plasma membrane components of adherens junctions. It also serves as an entry for certain mutant strains of herpes simplex virus and pseudorabies virus, and it is involved in cell to cell spreading of these viruses. Variations in this gene have been associated with differences in the severity of multiple sclerosis. Alternate transcriptional splice variants, encoding different isoforms, have been characterized.

See also
 Cluster of differentiation

References

Further reading

External links
 
 
 

Clusters of differentiation